Churence Rogers  (born June 3, 1953) is a Canadian politician from Newfoundland and Labrador, who was elected to the House of Commons of Canada in a by-election on December 11, 2017. He represents the electoral district of Bonavista—Burin—Trinity as a member of the Liberal Party of Canada caucus.

Early life
Churence Rogers was born and raised in Centreville-Wareham-Trinity.

Political career
He served as Centreville-Wareham-Trinity Mayor from 2009 to 2017, and previously served as Mayor of Harbour Breton from 1997 to 2003.

From 2011 to 2015, Rogers also served as President of Municipalities Newfoundland and Labrador (MNL). Under his leadership, MNL negotiated a new fiscal framework arrangement with the provincial government that invested millions of dollars annually into municipalities across Newfoundland and Labrador, helping to improve the lives of families throughout our province. At the same time, he served on the national Board of Directors for the Federation of Canadian Municipalities, and as the Chair of its Atlantic Caucus.

Federal Politics
Rogers was elected as member of parliament for the riding of Bonavista—Burin—Trinity in a by-election on December 11, 2017.

Rogers serves on the House of Commons Standing Committee on the Environment and Sustainability. He briefly served as a Member of the Standing Joint Committee on the Scrutiny of Regulations before being selected to sit on the House of Commons Standing Committee on Fisheries and Oceans. He is a Member of the Newfoundland and Labrador Caucus, Atlantic Caucus and Rural Caucus. Churence is also a Member of the Canada-United States Interparliamentary Group, the Canada-China Parliamentary Legislative Association, and the Canada-Taiwan Parliamentary Friendship Group.

Rogers was re-elected in the 2019 and 2021 federal elections.

Personal life
Rogers and his wife Yvonne have two children and four grandchildren.

Electoral record

Federal results

Provincial results

|}

References

External links

Living people
Liberal Party of Canada MPs
Members of the House of Commons of Canada from Newfoundland and Labrador
21st-century Canadian politicians
Mayors of places in Newfoundland and Labrador
1953 births
People from Newfoundland (island)